Ian Jakob Hoffmann (born September 8, 2001) is an American professional soccer player who plays as a midfielder for Moss FK in the Norwegian First Division.

Career

Youth 
Hoffman was born in Wilton, Connecticut, and spent time with various nearby academy teams such as Everton FC Westchester, Beachside Soccer Club and New York Red Bulls. When his family moved to Germany for work reasons, Ian started playing for 1. FC Köln before moving to Karlsruher SC in 2016. During his time at Karlsruher SC, Hoffman made 40 appearances for the club's under-19 team, scoring 5 goals.

Professional

Houston Dynamo 
On July 27, 2020, Hoffmann returned to the United States, joining Major League Soccer side Houston Dynamo. He would officially join the Houston roster on January 1, 2021, spending the remainder of 2020 with the club's USL Championship affiliate club Rio Grande Valley FC. He made his professional debut on August 28, 2020, starting in a 3–1 loss to San Antonio FC.  He made 5 appearances and had one assist during his time with RGVFC.

Hoffmann made his Dynamo debut on August 7, 2021, coming on as a substitute in a 2–0 loss to Minnesota United.  He appeared in the final 4 games of the season for Houston, including starting the last 2.  Hoffman made 6 appearances during the 2021 season as the Dynamo finished bottom of the Western Conference, failing to qualify for the playoffs.

Hoffmann started the 2022 season playing for Houston Dynamo 2 in MLS Next Pro, making 9 appearances for the Dynamo reserve side.

On June 23, 2022, Hoffmann moved on loan to USL Championship side Orange County SC for the remainder of the season.  He made his debut for Orange County on June 25, playing the full match in a 3–1 win vs Loudoun United.  Hoffmann made 15 appearances, all starts, while on loan with Orange County, with the team finishing last in the Western Conference.  Following the season the Dynamo declined Hoffmann's contract option.

Moss FK 
In February 2023, Hoffmann joined Norwegian First Division side Moss FK.

International career
Hoffmann has represented both the United States and Germany at various levels He qualifies for representing Germany through his Grandparents citizenship.

Career Statistics

Personal life 
Hoffman's father Andrew played college soccer at Georgetown University and played professionally in the APSL.

Born and raised in Connecticut, Hoffman moved to Germany with his family due to his dad's work in 2015.

References

External links
 

2001 births
Living people
American soccer players
Association football midfielders
Germany youth international footballers
Karlsruher SC players
1. FC Köln players
Houston Dynamo FC players
MLS Next Pro players
Orange County SC players
People from Wilton, Connecticut
Rio Grande Valley FC Toros players
Soccer players from Connecticut
USL Championship players
United States men's under-20 international soccer players
United States men's youth international soccer players
Major League Soccer players